Nidio Ricardo Ferreira Alves (born 17 June 1994) or Ricky is a football player who currently plays for Timor-Leste national football team as a defender.

International career
Ricky made his senior international debut in a 2-0 loss against Cambodia national football team in the friendly match on 29 May 2016.

References

1994 births
Living people
East Timorese footballers
Timor-Leste international footballers
Association football defenders
Footballers at the 2018 Asian Games
Asian Games competitors for East Timor